Chronic venous insufficiency (CVI) is a medical condition in which blood pools in the veins, straining the walls of the vein. The most common cause of CVI is superficial venous reflux which is a treatable condition. As functional venous valves are required to provide for efficient blood return from the lower extremities, this condition typically affects the legs. If the impaired vein function causes significant symptoms, such as swelling and ulcer formation, it is referred to as chronic venous disease. It is sometimes called chronic peripheral venous insufficiency and should not be confused with post-thrombotic syndrome in which the deep veins have been damaged by previous deep vein thrombosis.

Most cases of CVI can be improved with treatments to the superficial venous system or stenting the deep system. Varicose veins for example can now be treated by local anesthetic endovenous surgery.

Rates of CVI are higher in women than in men. Other risk factors include genetics, smoking, obesity, pregnancy, and prolonged standing.

Signs and symptoms

Signs and symptoms of CVI in the leg include the following:
 Varicose veins
 Itching (pruritus)
 Hyperpigmentation
 Phlebetic lymphedema
 Chronic swelling of the legs and ankles
 Leg ulcer

CVI in the leg may cause the following:
 Venous stasis
 Venous ulcers
 Stasis dermatitis, also known as varicose eczema
 Contact dermatitis, a disrupted epidermal barrier due to venous insufficiency, making patients more susceptible than the general population to contact sensitization and subsequent dermatitis.
 Atrophie blanche, an end point of a variety of conditions that appears as atrophic plaques of ivory white skin with telangiectasias. It represents late sequelae of lipodermatosclerosis where the skin has lost its nutrient blood flow.
 Lipodermatosclerosis,  an indurated plaque in the medial malleolus.
 Malignancy, malignant degeneration being a rare but important complication of venous disease since tumors that develop in the setting of an ulcer tend to be more aggressive.
 Pain, a feature of venous disease often overlooked and commonly undertreated.
 Anxiety
 Depression
 Inflammation
 Cellulitis

Causes

The most common cause of chronic venous insufficiency is reflux of the venous valves of superficial veins. This may in turn be caused by several conditions:
 Deep vein thrombosis (DVT), that is, blood clots in the deep veins. Chronic venous insufficiency caused by DVT may be described as postthrombotic syndrome. DVT triggers an inflammatory response subsequently injuring the vein wall.
 Superficial vein thrombosis.
 Phlebitis
 May–Thurner syndrome. This is a rare condition in which blood clots occur in the iliofemoral vein due to compression of the blood vessels in the leg. The specific problem is compression of the left common iliac vein by the overlying right common iliac artery. Many May-Thurner compressions are overlooked when there is no blood clot. More and more of them get nowadays diagnosed and treated (by stenting) due to advanced imaging techniques.
Deep and superficial vein thrombosis may in turn be caused by thrombophilia, which is an increased propensity of forming blood clots.

Arteriovenous fistula (an abnormal connection or passageway between an artery and a vein) may cause chronic venous insufficiency even with working vein valves.

Diagnosis

History and examination by a clinician for characteristic signs and symptoms are sufficient in many cases in ruling out systemic causes of venous hypertension such as hypervolemia and heart failure. A duplex ultrasound (doppler ultrasonography and b-mode) can detect venous obstruction or valvular incompetence as the cause, and is used for planning venous ablation procedures, but it is not necessary in suspected venous insufficiency where surgical intervention is not indicated.

Insufficiency within a venous segment is defined as reflux of more than 0.5 seconds with distal compression. Invasive venography can be used in patients who may require surgery or have suspicion of venous stenosis. Other modalities that may be employed are: ankle-brachial index to exclude arterial pathology, air or photoplethysmography, intravascular ultrasound, and ambulatory venous pressures, which provides a global assessment of venous competence. Venous plethysmography can assess for reflux and muscle pump dysfunction but the test is laborious and rarely done.

The venous filling time after the patient is asked to stand up from a seated position also is used to assess for CVI. Rapid filling of the legs less than 20 seconds is abnormal.

Classification

CEAP classification is based on Clinical, Etiological (causal), Anatomical, and Pathophysiological factors. According to Widmer Classification for assessment of chronic venous insufficiency (CVI), diagnosis of chronic venous insufficiency is clearly differentiated from varicose veins. It has been developed to guide decision-making in chronic venous insufficiency evaluation and treatment.

The CEAP classification for CVI is as follows:
 Clinical
 C0: no obvious feature of venous disease
 C1: the presence of reticular or spider veins
 C2: Obvious varicose veins
 C3: Presence of edema but no skin changes
 C4: skin discoloration, pigmentation
 C5: Ulcer that has healed
 C6: Acute ulcer
 Etiology
 Primary
 Secondary (trauma, birth control pill)
 Congenital (Klipper trenaunay)
 No cause is known
 Anatomic
 Superficial
 Deep
 Perforator
 No obvious anatomic location
 Pathophysiology
 Obstruction, thrombosis
 Reflux
 Obstruction and reflux
 No venous pathology

Management

Conservative
Conservative treatment of CVI in the leg involves symptomatic treatment and efforts to prevent the condition from getting worse instead of effecting a cure. This may include
 Manual compression lymphatic massage therapy
 Red vine leaf extract may have a therapeutic benefit.
 Sequential compression pump
 Ankle pump
 Compression stockings
 Blood pressure medicine
 Hydroxyethylrutoside medication
 Frequent periods of rest elevating the legs above the heart level
 Tilting the bed so that the feet are above the heart. This may be achieved by using a 20 cm (7-inch) bed wedge or sleeping in a 6 degree Trendelenburg position.

Surgical
Surgical treatment of CVI attempts a cure by physically changing the veins with incompetent valves. Surgical treatments for CVI include the following:
 Ligation. Tying off a vein to prevent blood flow
 Vein stripping. Removal of the vein.
 Surgical repair.
 Endovenous Laser Ablation
 Vein transplant.
 Subfascial endoscopic perforator surgery. Tying off the vein with an endoscope.
 Valve repair (experimental)
 Valve transposition (experimental)
 Hemodynamic surgeries.

Venous insufficiency conservative, hemodynamic and ambulatory treatment (CHIVA method) is an ultrasound guided, minimally invasive surgery strategic for the treatment of varicose veins, performed under local anaesthetic.

Prognosis
CVI is not a benign disorder and, with its progression, can lead to morbidity. Venous ulcers are common and very difficult to treat. Chronic venous ulcers are painful and debilitating. Even with treatment, recurrences are common if venous hypertension persists. Nearly 60% develop phlebitis which often progresses to deep vein thrombosis in more than 50% of patients. The venous insufficiency can also lead to severe hemorrhage. Surgery for CVI remains unsatisfactory despite the availability of numerous procedures.

References

External links 

Vascular diseases